Keilbahnhof (plural: Keilbahnhöfe, literally: "wedge railway station") is the German name for a railway station in which the station is located between branching railway tracks. It is a junction station that is part of the railway junction itself, with its platforms converging in one direction and diverging in the other. There appears to be no direct English equivalent for this term.

Definition 

A keilbahnhof is a type of junction station whose tracks usually diverge shortly before passing the platforms, and the station building being located between the tracks. The through tracks thus pass by on either side of the station building without rejoining one another again. This is in contrast to an "island station" (e.g. Olten railway station), in which the tracks merge again after passing either side of the station building (i.e. the building sits on a wide island platform). Rarely, there are keilbahnhof stations whose through tracks diverge in the area of the platforms, but never after them. In a keilbahnhof, there are at least two platforms, one on each side of the station building (e.g. Lichtensteig railway station), but additional platforms (or sidings) may be present on one or both sides.

The Y-shaped design of a keilbahnhof is not suited for splitting trains into separate rakes with different destinations (portion working). Often, the station is the terminus of the line(s) operating on the subordinate branch, while for the service(s) operating on the main branches it is a through station, although it can also be a through station on all services.

The station building can be located either between the diverging tracks or on the side of the tracks before they diverge (e.g. Monza railway station).

Examples in Germany

 on the Herbertingen–Aulendorf and Altshausen–Schwackenreute lines
 on the Halle–Hann. Münden line
Döbeln Hauptbahnhof on the Riesa–Chemnitz and Borsdorf–Coswig lines
 on the Węgliniec–Roßlau and Elsterwerda–Elsterwerda-Biehla lines
 on the Halle–Bebra and Friedrichroda lines
 on the Berlin-Hamburg and Hagenow Land–Schwerin lines
 on the Hanoverian Southern and Lehrte–Nordstemmen lines
 on the Hanoverian Southern, South Harz and Solling line
 on the Hanoverian Southern, Altenbeken–Kreiensen and Brunswick Southern lines
 on the Berlin–Hamburg, Magdeburg-Wittenberge and Wittenberge–Buchholz lines
 on the Dresden–Werdau and Schwarzenberg–Zwickau lines

Examples elsewhere

Australia 
Werris Creek railway station on the Main North, Mungindi and Binnaway lines

Austria 

Belgium 

Ottignies on the Belgian railway lines 139, 140 and the 161
Pepinster on the Belgian railway lines 37 and 44

France 
 on the Haut-Bugey and Lyon–Geneva lines
 on the Paris–Marseille, Moret–Lyon and Lyon–Geneva lines
 on the Figeac–Arvant and Brive-la-Gaillarde–Toulouse (via Capdenac) lines
Tarascon on the Tarascon–Sète line and two connectors to the Paris–Marseille lines

Italy 

 on the Milan–Chiasso, Lecco–Milan and Monza–Molteno lines
 on the Genoa–Pisa and Pisa–Lucca lines

New Zealand 
Hamilton on the North Island Main Trunk (NIMT) and East Coast Main Trunk (ECMT) lines

Switzerland 

 on the Bière–Apples–Morges line and branch line to L'Isle-Mont-la-Ville
 on the Thalwil–Arth-Goldau, Pfäffikon–Arth-Goldau and Gotthard lines
 on the Bern–Thun, Biel/Bienne–Bern and Olten–Bern lines
 on the Winterthur–Koblenz and Oerlikon–Bülach lines
 on the Orbe–Chavornay and Jura Foot lines
 on the Vallorbe–Le Brassus and Simplon lines (until 2022)
 on the Wil–Ebnat-Kappel and Bodensee–Toggenburg lines
 on the Langenthal–Oensingen, Oensingen–Balsthal and Jura Foot lines
 on the Chur–Rorschach and Ziegelbrücke–Sargans lines
 on the Martigny–Orsières line and branch line to Le Châble
 on the Solothurn–Worblaufen, Worb Dorf–Worblaufen and Zollikofen–Bern lines
 on the Thalwil–Arth-Goldau, Zug–Lucerne and Zürich–Zug lines
 on the Zürich–Winterthur and Oerlikon–Bülach lines

The Netherlands 
 on the Amsterdam–Arnhem and Amsterdam–Zutphen lines

United Kingdom 
 on the Chester–Manchester and Hooton–Helsby lines
 on the Stafford–Manchester and Crewe–Derby lines
 on the East Coastway lines
 on the North Kent and Mid-Kent lines; The latter is also used as a loop off the South Eastern Main Line
 on the London, Tilbury and Southend line and the Docklands Light Railway (DLR)
 on the Portsmouth and the Epsom Downs lines

United States 
 on the Providence/Stoughton Line (Northeast Corridor and Stoughton Branch)
 on the UP North and UP Northwest lines
 on the Morristown and Montclair–Boonton lines
 on the Baltimore–Ohio and Old Main lines

References

Railway stations by type
Rail transport in Germany